Corregidor is an island located at the entrance of Manila Bay in the southwestern part of Luzon in the Philippines, and is considered part of the Province of Cavite. Due to this location, Corregidor has historically been fortified with coastal artillery batteries to defend the entrance of Manila Bay and Manila itself from attacks by enemy warships.

Corregidor (Fort Mills) is the largest of the islands that formed the harbor defenses of Manila Bay, together with El Fraile Island (Fort Drum), Caballo Island (Fort Hughes), and Carabao Island (Fort Frank), which were all fortified during the American colonial period. The island was also the site of a small military airfield, as part of the defense.

During World War II, Corregidor played an important role during the invasion and liberation of the Philippines from the Imperial Japanese Army. The island was heavily bombarded during the later part of the war, where the ruins serve as a military memorial to American, Filipino, and Japanese soldiers who served and lost their lives on the battlefield. Corregidor is one of the most important historic and tourist sites in the country.

Geography

Despite being located nearer to the southern coast of Bataan, Corregidor and the other fortified islands of Manila Bay fall under the jurisdiction of the City of Cavite.

The island is divided into four sections:

Topside
The island's biggest area, which points towards the South China Sea, rises prominently to a large flat area that is called "Topside". Beneath this was the fortified communications center of the island, as well as the location for the Army headquarters, barracks for enlisted men, a branch of the Philippine Trust Co. bank, the Cine Corregidor movie theater, officers' quarters, underground ordnance shops, the parade ground, an Officers' Club with a 9-hole Golf Course, tennis courts, and swimming pool, and the bulk of the artillery batteries that constituted the strength of Corregidor.

Middleside
Middleside is a small plateau that interrupts the upward slope from Bottomside to Topside, and was the location of 2-story officers' quarters, barracks for the enlisted men, a hospital, quarters for non-commissioned officers, a service club, PX, and two schoolhouses—one for the children of Filipino soldiers and the other for American children.

Bottomside

Bottomside is the lower part of the island and is the neck that connects the tail and head of the island.  South of Bottomside was Barangay or Barrio San José (near what was Navy Beach); on the north is what was Army Dock, with its three large piers, and, east of Bottomside, is the Malinta Tunnel.  The Malinta Hill separates Bottomside from the Tail End.

Tailside
The Tailside or Tail End is the remaining portion of the island where different memorials, shrines and the island's airstrip are located. Kindley Field was constructed in the early 1920s and named in honor of an early hero of the U.S. Army Air Corps. The airfield was operated then by the army, and the navy had a seaplane base. The short runway, cramped and hilly terrain had limited its use. 

In 1968 during the first term of Ferdinand Marcos, Tailside became the site of the Jabidah massacre, an event which angered the Philippines Muslim minority enough to trigger the Moro conflict, eventually leading to the creation of the Bangsamoro Autonomous Region in Muslim Mindanao (BARMM).

Geology
Corregidor and Caballo islands are remnants of a volcanic crater, the Corregidor Caldera, which was last active about one million years ago.  However, the Philippine Institute of Volcanology and Seismology (PHIVOLCS) still classifies Corregidor as a potentially active volcano.

History

Spanish colonial era
The island came under Spanish sovereignty on May 19, 1570, when Miguel Lopez de Legazpi and his forces arrived in Manila Bay.  Legazpi was authorized by the Spanish Crown to establish the capital of the Philippines in Manila, and to convert the Muslims in Luzon and Mindanao to Christianity. Corregidor was used as a support site for the nine Spanish galleons used during the campaign.

Under Spanish rule, Corregidor served not only as a fortress of defense, a penal institution, and a station for customs inspection, but also as a signal outpost to warn Manila of the approach of hostile ships. 

The name "Corregidor" comes from the Spanish word corregir, meaning "to correct". Isla del Corregidor, the old name of the place, literally means "the Corregidor's island".

Several explanations for how the island was named have been suggested. One story states that the island was called Isla del Corregidor (literally, Island of the Corrector) due to the Spanish customs system, wherein all ships entering Manila Bay were required to stop and have their documents checked and "corrected". Another version claims that the island was used as a penitentiary or correctional institution by the Spanish government, and thus came to be called El Corregidor. Corregidor is also a specific position of authority within the former Spanish administrative structure, the title for the man who was the head of a territorial unit known as un corregimiento. The institution of administrative districts called corregimientos (with each district chief known as El Corregidor) was in use throughout Spanish America and the Philippines. For example, the Philippines had "corregidores" in charge of Bataan and Zambales, among others.

On November 23, 1574, the Chinese pirate Limahong and his 65-vessel fleet with 3,000 men anchored between Corregidor and Mariveles. From that site, he launched two successive attacks against Manila, commanded either by Limahong himself or by the Japanese pirate Sioco. Both attacks failed due to a fierce battle defense led by the governor, Juan de Salcedo.

In November and December 1600, during the Eighty Years' War between the Netherlands and Spain, the Dutch privateer and Admiral Olivier van Noort used the surroundings of Corregidor Island as an anchorage for his last two ships, Mauritius and Eendracht. From there he engaged in activities that the Spanish considered to be piracy, targeting ships on the sailing route to and from Manila. This situation ended after the naval combat of Fortune Island on December 14, 1600. The Spanish lost their flagship, the hastily converted Manila galleon San Diego, as the unbalanced weight of her extra cannon caused a permanent list and put her gun ports below the waterline. But they captured the Dutch ship Eendracht, and Admiral van Noort retreated from the Philippines. Continuing the three year voyage in his one remaining ship and arriving home with 45 men still alive, van Noort became the first Dutch sea captain to circumnavigate the world. The Dutch East India Company was formed a few months later.

In response to these events, and also to prevent sudden attack by Muslims from Mindanao, a watch vessel was posted at Corregidor to control the entrance to the bay. According to data from 1637, this vessel had a crew of twenty men, who were paid 540 pesos a year for this task.

Corregidor Island was taken over by the Dutch in June 1647, and from there they launched an offensive against Cavite which was repelled by the Spanish garrison under the command of Andre Lopez de Azalduigui. The Dutch would remain on the island for seven more months, however, as it served them well as an operations base from which to intercept Chinese merchant traffic in the vicinity of Luzon and Cebu. Finally they withdrew with few of their expectations fulfilled.

In October 1762, during the British invasion of Manila and Cavite led by Samuel Cornish and  William Draper, Corregidor was used as an anchorage for warships, particularly HMS Panther and HMS Argo. It was also used as an anchorage for the fully loaded Spanish treasure galleon Santisima Trinidad they had captured, during November 1762. The British sailed the captured galleon to Portsmouth, England, where it was sold for a fortune.

The arrival of the Spanish fleet led by General Ignacio Mario de Alava, with the mission to place the Philippine Islands on alert, did not affect the fortunes of Corregidor Island. He limited his activity to the setting up of a naval station at Cavite.

On January 18, 1853, the Corregidor Island Lighthouse was first lit on the highest part of the island, to mark the entrance of Manila Bay for vessels coming in from the South China Sea.

Spanish–American War
Corregidor Island was included in the Philippines' defense plan prepared in 1885 by General Cerero, but no action was taken to implement it. When the U.S. Navy's attack was thought to be imminent, a 12 cm gun of the "Hontoria System", which came from the Spanish Navy's cruiser Antonio de Ulloa, and two shorter 12 cm guns of the same caliber from the Spanish gunboat General Lezo, were installed on the rocky island of El Fraile. On Caballo Island, south of Corregidor, the Spanish army installed three 15 cm naval guns from the Spanish navy cruiser Velasco, which was undergoing repairs.

At midnight on the night of April 30 to May 1, 1898, U.S. Navy Commodore George Dewey led his naval squadron, with his flag hoisted on board the protected cruiser , eastward along the southern coast of Corregidor Island, beyond the reach of Spanish batteries and with no navigational lights on, preparing to fight the Battle of Manila Bay.

At a distance about one mile off El Fraile, Dewey's fleet changed course to the northeast, steaming towards Manila. When they were discovered, the Spaniards fired from El Fraile's artillery. Since the flotilla's speed was ten knots, they were soon far away from the Spanish batteries. Dewey sailed for Cavite where he destroyed the naval forces of Admiral Montojo.

Once the Cavite shipyard was subdued by means of a stipulated pact, two American ships went ashore at Corregidor Island on May 3 forcing the Spaniards on the island to surrender. Colonel Garces, chief of the coast batteries at the entrance of Manila Bay, and the island's governor, First Class Naval Lieutenant Augusto Miranda, were urged to come to terms with the Americans, and so they did. Therefore, Miranda remained on the island with only 100 soldiers under the Spanish flag; Garces and officers under his command, as well as 292 men with their weapons and ammunition, were transferred to Mariveles port. From there they moved through the provinces of Bataan and Pampanga until they reached Manila on May 5. There they joined the Spanish navy battalion which was already quartered in Sampaloc.

On May 4, the American ships opened fire against the 100 men who, according to the pact, had been left on Corregidor and demanded the garrison forces be reduced to 25 men. The Spanish governor consulted Manila authorities, and they ordered the evacuation of the island. The troops were sent to Naic, Cavite on boats while the island's governor was transferred to the American cruiser USS Baltimore and became a prisoner with his family. The Americans offered to free him but the governor rejected this. Shortly afterwards, he was disembarked in Balanga, Bataan. In this way the Spanish presence on Corregidor Island, which had lasted 328 years, came to an end.

A cannon that had guarded the residence of the Spanish colonial governor on Corregidor, the Dewey Cannon, was taken as a prize of war to the United States.  It was later awarded to the rural town of Three Oaks, Michigan, where it was remounted as a historical display.

American colonial period

In 1902, the island was organized as an American military reservation. In 1903, a convalescent hospital was established by the U.S. Army.

The Board of Fortifications chaired by William H. Taft recommended that key harbors of territories acquired after the Spanish–American War be fortified. Consequently, Corregidor was fortified and incorporated into the harbor defenses Manila and Subic Bays. In 1908, a Regular Army post was established on the island, designated as Fort Mills, in honor of Brigadier General Samuel Meyers Mills, Jr., Chief of Artillery of the U.S. Army from 1905 to 1906. By early 1909, H Company of the 2nd Battalion of the Corps of Engineers was assigned to Corregidor and started on the construction of concrete emplacements, bomb-proof shelters, and trails at various parts of the island. This pioneer engineer company left Fort Mills on March 15, 1912. All or part of 35 different numbered Coast Artillery Corps companies served tours at Fort Mills between 1909 and 1923.

The defense of Corregidor was the immediate responsibility of the Philippine Coast Artillery Command, commanded by Major General George F. Moore at the start of World War II. Stationed on the island after the return to the regimental system in 1924 were the following regular units:
 59th Coast Artillery (U.S. Regular Army)
 60th Coast Artillery AA (U.S. Regular Army)
 91st Coast Artillery (Philippine Scouts)
 92nd Coast Artillery (Tractor Drawn) (Philippine Scouts)
 Headquarters, Harbor Defenses of Manila and Subic Bays and the Seaward Defense Command.

In addition to Fort Mills; the army post on Caballo Island was named Fort Hughes; on El Fraile, Fort Drum; and on Carabao Island, Fort Frank. According to the war plan, these forts could withstand a six-month-long siege, after which the United States would provide aid. The fortifications on Corregidor were designed solely to withstand seaborne attack. Though American military planners realized that airplanes would render Fort Mills obsolete, the United States was restricted from improving the fortifications by the Washington Naval Treaty of 1922. In 1932–1934, the U.S. Army constructed the Malinta Tunnel, with its series of related laterals, to protect its military stores and vital installations in the event of war.

Fort Mills's defense installations had cost the U.S. government more than $150 million, which did not include the expense of fortifying the neighboring islands of Caballo, Carabao, and El Fraile.

Infrastructure
The latter were used largely to haul heavy equipment and ammunition from Bottomside to the different Batteries. The Corregidor High School was where children of both Filipino and American servicemen assigned on the island studied. The island also had an electric trolley system as public transport, a movie house (Cine Corregidor), a baseball field and a swimming pool. The business and social center of this community was found on Topside.

Water supply
Before the war and during the siege, Corregidor depended on Bataan for most of its potable water. For this purpose, barges were used to haul water either from Mariveles or Cabcaben, Bataan.

World War II
During World War II, Corregidor was the site of two costly sieges and pitched battles—the first during the first months of 1942, and the second in January 1945—between the Imperial Japanese Army and the U.S. Army, along with its smaller subsidiary force, the Philippine Army.

During the Battle of the Philippines (1941–42), the Imperial Japanese Army invaded Luzon from the north (at Lingayen Gulf) in early 1942 and attacked Manila from its landward side. American and Filipino troops under the command of General Douglas MacArthur, retreated to the Bataan Peninsula, west of Manila Bay. The fall of Bataan on April 9, 1942, ended all organized opposition by the U.S. Armed Forces in the Far East (USAFFE) and gave way to the invading Japanese forces in Luzon in the northern Philippines. They were forced to surrender due to the lack of food and ammunition, leaving Corregidor and its adjacent islets at Manila Bay as the only areas in the region under U.S. control.

Between December 24, 1941, and February 19, 1942, Corregidor was the temporary location for the Government of the Philippines. On December 30, 1941, outside the Malinta Tunnel, Manuel L. Quezon and Sergio Osmeña were inaugurated respectively as president and vice-president of the Philippines Commonwealth for a second term. General Douglas MacArthur also used Corregidor as Allied headquarters until March 11, 1942. The Voice of Freedom, the radio station of USAFFE broadcast from Corregidor, aired the infamous announcement of the fall of Bataan. In April 1942, one battalion of the Fourth Marines was sent to reinforce the island's beach defenses.

The Battle of Corregidor was the culmination of the Japanese campaign for the conquest of the Philippines. The fortifications across the entrance to Manila Bay were the remaining obstacle for the 14th Area Army of the Imperial Japanese Army led by Lieutenant General Masaharu Homma. American and Filipino soldiers on Corregidor and the neighboring islets held out against the Japanese to deny the use of Manila Bay, but the Imperial Japanese Army brought heavy artillery to the southern end of Bataan, and proceeded north to blockade Corregidor. Japanese troops forced the surrender of the remaining American and Filipino forces on May 6, 1942, under the command of Lieutenant General Jonathan Wainwright. 

The battle for the recapture of Corregidor occurred from February 16 to 26, 1945, in which American and Filipino forces successfully recaptured the island fortress from the Japanese occupying forces.

Jabidah massacre

In 1968, an area near Kindley Airfield at Tailside was the site of the Jabidah massacre, a key event in the history of the Bangsamoro and the Moro people.  

In connection with the North Borneo dispute, the President of the Philippines at the time, Ferdinand Marcos, had secretely authorized the execution of Operation Merdeka, a in which a secret Moro commando unit code-named "Jabidah" would be trained in Corregidor to destabilize and take over Sabah.  

Varying accounts say 18 to 69 recruits, mostly Tausug from Sulu, eventually refused to take orders from their officers - variously explained as due to the non-payment of their salaries or the discovery of the specifics of their final mission, which they found morally unacceptable.  The officers then allegedly shot all of the men to death, with only one witness, Jibin Arula, managing to escape by pretending to be dead.

Jibin Arula was rescued by fishermen near Caraballo Island when he attempted to swim to escape, and his account eventually became the subject of numerous trials and hearings. Despite this, the officers implicated in the massacre were never convicted which served as a clear indication to the Muslim community that Marcos' government had little regard for them. This created a furor within the Muslim community in the Philippines, and eventually triggered calls for Moro independence; the rise of separatist movements such as the Muslim Independence Movement, the Moro National Liberation Front, and the Moro Islamic Liberation Front; and the Moro conflict in general. The government of the now-autonomous  Bangsamoro Autonomous Region in Muslim Mindanao (BARMM) acknowledges the Jabidah Massacre as a key moment in Bangsamoro history.

In 2015, during a ceremony marking the 47th anniversary of the massacre, a symbolic peace marker: 'Mindanao Garden of Peace: Corregidor Island' was turned over to the families of the survivors of the massacre.

Fortifications
There were 23 batteries installed on Corregidor, consisting of 56 coastal defense guns and mortars.  In addition, Corregidor had 13 anti-aircraft artillery batteries with 76 guns (28 3-inch and 48 .50-caliber) and 10 60-inch Sperry searchlights.

Although capable of an all around traverse, these guns, due to their flat trajectories, were not effective for use on defensive perimeter targets on Bataan and Cavite, as their maximum elevation was 35 degrees.

During the siege, the island had ample armor-piercing ammunition but very little of the anti-personnel type, which then was of greatest demand for use against land targets on Bataan.  In fact, most of the anti-personnel shells were only for the 12-inch mortars of Batteries Way and Geary.

Battery Monja
Battery Monja is located on Wheeler Point. It was operated by Battery G of the 92nd Coast Artillery Regiment, Philippine Scouts. The battery had two French 155mm GPF cannon, both of which were hidden in the sides of the island's bluffs. One gun was commanded by 2LT Robert L. Obourn,  who claimed that, towards the end of the battle, "You could see the shells wobble towards the [enemy] ships. Our guns were reduced to nothing more than muskets."  Obourn's gun was struck and destroyed on April 28, 1942, killing 2 of his gunners. The remaining crew of Battery Monja continued to fight against the Japanese as guerrillas until July 18, 1942. Only 6 men, including Lt. Obourn, survived their capture. The 5 enlisted men that were serving as gunners for the battery attempted to escape from their temporary prison camp two days after capture; they all were killed during their attempted escape.

Battery Way

Battery Way, named for Lt. Henry N Way, which along with Battery Geary, was the mainstay of the Corregidor Garrison during the Japanese invasion.  Its four  mortars, capable of a 360-degree traverse, could fire on land targets at Bataan.  They brought the most destruction on Japanese positions during the attempted landings on the southwest coast of Bataan late in January to the middle of February 1942.  These mortars were silenced by enemy shelling in May 1942.

Battery Geary
Battery Geary was a battery of eight 13-ton,  mortars. Defiladed in a hollow on Corregidor's Southern coast it was fairly well protected from Japanese shelling. On January 6, 1942, while under the command of Capt. Ben Ewing King, a Japanese bomb landed in a makeshift temporary bunker killing 31 of Battery Geary's NCOs and canoneers. Early in the morning of January 26 Battery Geary opened fire on a unit of Japanese soldiers near Longaskawayan Point on the west side of the Bataan Peninsula. This was the first time fixed coastal artillery had fired at an enemy since the close of the Civil War. Although the fire was considered accurate and effective, Col. Bunker decided to replace Capt. King and he was sent to perform the duties of fort XO and to command HQ Battery on Ft. Drum. He was replaced at Battery Geary by Capt. Thomas W. Davis. Later, this battery was pinpointed by the Japanese artillery and was subjected to heavy shelling. One direct hit by a 240-mm shell, which detonated the magazines of this battery on May 2, 1942, proved to be the most crippling shot during the entire siege of Corregidor. Large chunks of steel were blown as far as the Malinta Tunnel, killing 27 of the battery crew instantly. Also, one mortar still had a live round in its breech, and it was in the process of firing the shell when the magazine was hit. That live anti-personnel round still lies within the breach of the mortar.

Corregidor today
After the war, many people, most of them veterans, visited the island because of its history.  Today, Corregidor is a historic monument as well as a tourist destination.  Many travel companies offer day tours on the island featuring military installations used during World War II.  Most of the war-ravaged buildings have not been restored, and left as they were after the war in reverence to the Filipino and American soldiers who died there.

Pacific War Memorial

Standing on the highest part of Corregidor's Topside is the Pacific War Memorial, which was built by the United States Government to honor the Filipino and American soldiers who participated in World War II.  It was completed in 1968 at the cost of three million dollars.  The major memorial structure is a rotunda with a circular altar directly under the dome's oculus through which light falls on the altar during daylight hours. Light lands directly on the altar on May 5 at exactly 12 noon, in commemoration of the surrender of the troops stationed there and the courage they exhibited over 72 days of bombing.  Located behind the Memorial is the Eternal Flame of Freedom, a  Corten steel structure commissioned to Aristides Demetrios symbolizing freedom.

Malinta Tunnel
The Malinta Tunnel, which is the last stronghold of the joint Philippine and American military prior to the Japanese takeover during the World War II, is now home to an audio-visual presentation by National Artist Lamberto V. Avellana of the events that took place on the island, including the reluctant departure of General Douglas MacArthur and the evacuation of the Philippine president Manuel L. Quezon and his family to unoccupied areas of the Philippines and eventually in exile in the United States.

Filipino Heroes Memorial
One of the most recent additions to Corregidor is the Filipino Heroes Memorial located in the Tail End.  This 6,000-square meter complex has 14 murals depicting heroic battles fought by Filipinos from the 15th century up to the present day.  It was designed by Francisco Mañosa, while the murals and a statue of a Filipino guerrilla were sculpted by Manuel Casas.  The complex was inaugurated by President Fidel V. Ramos on August 28, 1992.

Japanese Garden of Peace
This garden was built as a memorial to the Japanese soldiers who served and died on the island during World War II. The park includes a praying area, shrines, markers and a small pavilion that houses photographs and memorabilia.

Corregidor lighthouse

The lighthouse on Topside is one of the oldest landmarks in Corregidor, first lit in 1853. The grounds and keeper's dwellings were further improved during the American occupation. During World War II, the lighthouse was damaged during the siege of Corregidor. The lighthouse was totally reconstructed in the 1950s with a different design and stands on the same spot where the first lighthouse once stood. The whole lantern of the lighthouse was recently replaced by the Philippine Coast Guard to run on solar power.

Notable people 
 Selma Calmes, anesthesiologist, was born on Corregidor.

See also
 List of islands in the Greater Manila Area
 List of islands of the Philippines
 Fort Drum (El Fraile Island)

References
Notes

Sources
 
 Gerez, M. B. The Story of Corregidor.

Further reading

External links

 
Islands of Manila Bay
Islands of Cavite
United States military in the Philippines
Military facilities in Cavite
Cavite City
National Shrines of the Philippines